Lac-Ashuapmushuan is an unorganized territory in the Canadian province of Quebec, Canada, located in the regional county municipality of Le Domaine-du-Roy. The region had a population of 140 as of the Canada 2021 Census, and covered a land area of 14,684.28 km2. It is home to the Ashuapmushuan Wildlife Reserve.

The eponymous Ashuapmushuan Lake is roughly in the centre of the territory. Its name is of Innu origin, meaning "place where one lies in wait for moose".

In 1685, French fur traders set up a trading post near Lake Ashuapmushuan that remained almost continuously in operation until the middle of the 19th century. It successively came under control of the Traite de Tadoussac (French period), King's Posts (English period), the North West Company (1802), and the Hudson's Bay Company (1821).

Quebec Route 167 goes through the territory, but there are no services or fuel available for its entire length.

Etymology 
The Ashuapmushuan Wildlife Reserve and the unorganized territory of Lac-Ashuapmushuan take their name from the Ashuapmushuan River. This river flows into Lake Saint-Jean and was frequently traveled by fur traders at the time of the New France and also the English regime, in order to make commercial treaties, especially human trafficking fur. This river was a preferred axis to connect in canoes between Lac Saint-Jean and James Bay. This area is renowned for hunting and fishing.

Demographics
Population trend:
 Population in 2021: 140 (2016 to 2021 population change: 288.9%)
 Population in 2016: 36
 Population in 2011: 28 
 Population in 2006: 35
 Population in 2001: 0
 Population in 1996: 0
 Population in 1991: 3

Private dwellings occupied by usual residents: 96 (total dwellings: 571)

References

External links

See also 
Le Domaine-du-Roy Regional County Municipality
Rivière à l'Ours (Ashuapmushuan River)
Ovide River,
Petite rivière à l'Ours (rivière à l'Ours) - West
Petite rivière Eusèbe
Rivière à la Carpe (Petite rivière Eusèbe)
Deuxième bras des Iroquois, un cours d'eau
List of unorganized territories in Quebec

Unorganized territories in Saguenay–Lac-Saint-Jean
Hudson's Bay Company trading posts